Scuttler or Scuttlers may refer to:

Scuttlers, criminals in street gangs in 19th-century Manchester
In scuttling of ships, those responsible
In The Crack in Space by Philip K. Dick, a transport device
In The Elder Scrolls Online, a non-sentient reptile
Scuttlers (play), a 2015 play by Rona Munro

See also
Scuttle (disambiguation)